
Royal Inspector was the highest ranking colonial officer in Danish Greenland 1782–1924. They were agents of the Royal Greenland Trading Department established by its Instruction of 1782 and reported to the Board of Managers of the company in Copenhagen.

As senior agents of the company, they were generally forbidden under the Instruction from marrying any non-European women, though Inspector Nicolai Zimmer's wife was half-Inuit.

Royal Inspectors of North Greenland

North Greenland comprised the northwest coast of Greenland between Holsteinsborg and Upernavik.

Johan Friedrich Schwabe (1782–1786)
Jens Clausen Wille (1786–1790)
Børge Johan Schultz (1790–1797)
Claus Bendeke (1797–1803)
Peter Hanning Motzfeldt (1803–1817)
Johannes West (1817–1825)
Carl Peter Holbøll (1825–1828)
Ludvig Fasting (1828–1843)
Hans Peter Christian Møller (1843–1845)
Nicolai Zimmer (1845–1846)
Christian Søren Marcus Olrik (1846–1866)
Carl August Ferdinand Bolbroe (1866–1867)
Sophus Theodor Krarup-Smith (1867–1882)
Hjalmar Christian Reinholdt (1882–1883) acting
Niels Alfred Andersen (1883–1898)           
Johan Carl Joensen (1898–1900) acting
Jens Daugaard-Jensen (1900–1912)         
Anders Peter Olsen (1912–1913) acting
Harald Lindow (1913–1924)

Royal Inspectors of South Greenland

South Greenland comprised the southwest coast between Sukkertoppen and Nennortalik.

Bendt Olrik (1782–1789)
Andreas Molbech Lund (1789–1795)
Claus Bendeke (1795–1797)
Niels Rosing Bull (1797–1802)
Marcus Nissen Myhlenphort (1802–1821) acting (until 1803)
Christian Alexander Platou (1821–1823) acting
Arent Christopher Heilmann (1823–1824) acting
Christian Alexander Platou (1824–1827)
Ove Valentin Kielsen (1827–1828)
Carl Peter Holbøll (1828–1856)
Jørgen Nielsen Møller (1856–1857) acting
Hinrich Johannes Rink (1857–1868)
Albert E. Blichfeldt Høyer (1868–1869)
Hannes Peter Stephensen (1870–1882)
Frederik Tryde Lassen (1882–1884) acting
Carl Julius Peter Ryberg (1884–1890)
Johan Carl Joansen (1890–1891) acting
Conrad Poul Emil Brummerstedt (1891–1892) acting
Edgar Christian Fencker (1892–1899)
Regnar Stephensen (1899–1902)
Oscar Peter Cornelius Koch (1902–1903)
Ole Bendixen (1903–1914)
Oluf Hastrup (1914–1915)
Carl Frederik Harries (1915–1923)
Christian Simony (1924) acting
Knud Oldendow (1924) acting

Royal Inspector of East Greenland

East Greenland comprised the east coast, with Ammassalik and Scoresbysund.

Ejnar Mikkelsen (1933–1950)

See also
 Major Claus Paarss, the governor of Greenland from 1728–1730
 List of governors of Greenland, for chief administrators after 1924

References

Inspectors
Greenland